Aakhri Kasam is a 1979 Bollywood action film directed by Dinesh-Ramnesh. The film stars Kabir Bedi, Vinod Mehra, Yogeeta Bali and Om Shivpuri in lead roles.

Plot
Jagga, a labour lives in a village with his baby and wife. Local zamindar raped and killed his wife and son. Jagga wants to avenge the death of her family but he could not. He abducts Zamindar's sons, and brings him up as a good man with high morality.

Cast
Kabir Bedi as Kishan / Badal
Vinod Mehra as Inspector Ram
Yogeeta Bali as Champa
Madan Puri as Malang Baba
Om Shivpuri as Zamindar
Urmila Bhatt as Zamindar's Wife
Nazir Hussain as Mangal
Satyendra Kapoor as Jagga
Mohan Sherry as Durjan Singh 
Imtiaz Khan as Sangram Singh

Music

Music was by Ravindra Jain. Lyrics were written by Ravindra Jain and Dev Kohli.

References

External links
 

1979 films
1970s Hindi-language films
Films scored by Ravindra Jain
Indian action drama films
Indian rape and revenge films